Xu Xi (Xú Xī))(died before 975), was a Chinese painter in the Southern Tang kingdom during the Five Dynasties and Ten Kingdoms period.

Notes

References
 Ci hai bian ji wei yuan hui (辞海编辑委员会）. Ci hai （辞海）. Shanghai: Shanghai ci shu chu ban she （上海辞书出版社）, 1979.

9th-century births
Year of birth uncertain
Year of death unknown
10th-century Chinese painters
Painters from Nanjing
Southern Tang painters